Guanghua Law School is the law school of Zhejiang University in Hangzhou, Zhejiang, China.

Introduction
Guanghua is the law school of Zhejiang University, located in the Zhijiang Campus, Zhejiang University, close to the Liuhe Pagoda and the Qiantang River.

Brief history
It was reorganized in 2007, at the 110th anniversary of Zhejiang University. Before, it was the Zhejiang University's law school, which was first founded in 1945. 

In 1952, due to the Adjustment of University Colleges & Departments (中國高校院系調整/中国高校院系调整), Zhejiang University was dissociated and only kept its engineering (major) and a few science (minor) parts. Its humanities and major science parts were separated from the university and further formed the new Hangzhou University, so the law school was moved into the newly established Hangzhou University, and became its Department of Law. 

In 1995, the Department of Law, Hangzhou University was enlarged and developed into the Law School, Hangzhou University. 1998, the Hangzhou University re-merged into the Zhejiang University, so that Zhejiang University re-obtained its law school.

References

External links
 Guanghua Law School, Zhejiang University (Chinese Homepage)
 News: The Guanghua Law School of Zhejiang University was formally founded (Chinese)

Schools and colleges of Zhejiang University
Educational institutions established in 1945
1945 establishments in China
Zhijiang Campus, Zhejiang University